Central Ranges (code CER) is an Australian bioregion, with an area of 101,640.44 square kilometres (39,244 sq mi) spreading across two states and one territory: South Australia, Western Australia, and the Northern Territory. It forms a large part of the World Wide Fund for Nature Central Ranges xeric scrub ecoregion.

References

Further reading
 Thackway, R and I D Cresswell (1995) An interim biogeographic regionalisation for Australia : a framework for setting priorities in the National Reserves System Cooperative Program Version 4.0 Canberra : Australian Nature Conservation Agency, Reserve Systems Unit, 1995. 

Biogeography of Western Australia
IBRA regions